Rail transport in Malaysia consists of heavy rail (including commuter rail), light rapid transit (LRT), mass rapid transit
(MRT), monorails, airport rail links and a funicular railway line. Heavy rail is mostly used for intercity passenger and freight transport as well as some urban public transport, while rapid transit is used for intra-city urban public transport in Kuala Lumpur, the national capital, and the surrounding Klang Valley region. There are two airport rail link systems linking Kuala Lumpur with the Kuala Lumpur International Airport and Sultan Abdul Aziz Shah Airport. The longest monorail line in the country is also used for public transport in Kuala Lumpur, while the only funicular railway line is in Penang.

The railway network covers most of the 11 states in Peninsular Malaysia. In East Malaysia, only the state of Sabah has railways. The network is also connected to the Thai railway  network in the north.  If the Burma Railway is rebuilt, services to Myanmar, India, and China could be initiated.

Railway infrastructure

Metre gauge rail

Peninsular Malaysia

The intercity railway network in Peninsular Malaysia consists of two main lines: The KTM West Coast Line between Singapore and Padang Besar, Perlis, on the Malaysian-Thai border, and the KTM East Coast Line between Gemas in Negeri Sembilan and Tumpat in Kelantan. There are also several branch lines between Kuala Lumpur and Port Klang, Batu Junction and Batu Caves, Bukit Mertajam and Butterworth, Kempas and Tanjung Pelepas and Kempas and Pasir Gudang. The entire 1,699 km network uses  tracks. The network uses a ballasted setup with locally manufactured concrete sleepers. Since the early 1980s, companies formed via international collaboration, such as Mastrak Sdn Bhd had been producing these sleepers via technology transfer. In the five years period of 1982-1987 alone, it was estimated that about 500,000 pieces of sleepers had been laid for the Kerdau-Jerantut and Sungai Yu-Tumpat lines, giving clear preference due to its advantages over wooden sleepers. This was also evident in the changes made by Sabah State Railway in 2006 for the network under their control.

The network is linked with the Thai railway network at Padang Besar.

A total of 438 km of the network is double-tracked and electrified. They include portions of the West Coast Line between Gemas and Padang Besar and the entire Port Klang branch line as well as Batu Caves branch line. The double-tracked and electrified portions between Tanjung Malim and Pulau Sebang/Tampin, and between Padang Besar and Padang Rengas, as well as the Port Klang, Batu Caves and Butterworth branch lines are used for commuter rail services.

Double tracking and electrification of the stretch of the Batu Caves branch line between Sentul and Batu Caves were completed, having added 7.5 km of double-tracked and electrified sections to the network in 2010. Double tracking and electrification of the West Coast line between Ipoh and Padang Besar started in January 2008 and was completed by November 2014, adding a further 329 km of double-tracked and electrified railway to the network.

Malaysia's national petroleum company Petronas owns a railway line which links its oil refinery complex and the nearby town of Kerteh, Terengganu, with the petrochemical complex in Gebeng, Kuantan, and Kuantan Port near Kuantan, Pahang. The line is mainly used to transport petroleum products, but it has been opened up recently for general freight transport, with operation being conducted by KTM. There have been proposals to extend the line to connect with the KTM line at Mentakab, and there are suggestions to go as far as Kuala Terengganu and Tumpat.

A 71km single track railway, known as the Pasir Gudang Line, exists between Johor Port in Pasir Gudang and Port of Tanjung Pelepas. In October 2016, Transport Minister Datuk Seri Liow Tiong Lai said the line will be upgraded to double track to allow for cargo and passenger train services.

Sabah 

There is a  railway line linking Tanjung Aru near Kota Kinabalu and Tenom in the interior of Sabah state. The line is the only railway on the island of Borneo. Normal passenger trains operated by the Sabah State Railway Department. The line has been suffering from lack of maintenance for many years and in 2006, the Malaysian Government funded rehabilitation works for the line. A pipe dream is to have a railway line from Kota Kinabalu to Kuching through Brunei though the cost of this would mean seeking funding from Brunei.

Standard gauge rail lines
Malaysia's only standard gauge rail lines are currently found within Kuala Lumpur and the Klang Valley.

Ekspres Rail Link (ERL)

One of Malaysia's two fastest rail lines is the  standard gauge airport rail link between Kuala Lumpur and the Kuala Lumpur International Airport. The line was constructed by Express Rail Link, which also operates the two train services which use the line, namely the KLIA Ekspres and KLIA Transit.

Light Rail Transit (LRT)

Selangor and Kuala Lumpur

There are currently two operational light rail systems in Malaysia. One is used as the major public transport system in the Klang Valley, while another acts as a automated people mover at the Kuala Lumpur International Airport to ferry passengers from the Main Terminal Building and the satellite building.

The LRT system in the Klang valley consist of three LRT lines which are the Kelana Jaya Line, the Ampang Line and Sri Petaling Line. It is mostly elevated except for a  stretch where it goes underground and a short at-grade stretch in the north. The Kelana Jaya Line was completely operational from June 1999. The older Ampang Line and Sri Petaling Line share a common track between the suburb of Sentul in the north of Kuala Lumpur and Chan Sow Lin in the central region, before branching out to their respective termini. The  Ampang Line travels to Ampang in the east and the  Sri Petaling Line travels towards southern Kuala Lumpur and onwards to Puchong. The system is mostly a mixture of at-grade and elevated tracks outside the city, and is completely elevated with it runs through the city. Both lines were completely opened in 1998. The Kelana Jaya Line and the Sri Petaling Line both terminate at Putra Heights.

The automated people mover system at Kuala Lumpur International Airport, called the "Aerotrain", is a simple people-mover shuttle system running along two  guiderails between the Main Terminal Building and Satellite Building. The two ends of the guiderails are elevated while the middle portion goes under the main airport taxiway. Each rail has a three-car automatic driver-less train.

Perak
In November 2021, the state government of Perak has expressed interest in constructing 2 lines across Ipoh, which will also include neighbouring towns such as Batu Gajah. There will be a total of 28 stations across both lines. Line 1 will start at Meru Raya and terminate at Batu Gajah, whereas Line 2 will start from Sunway City Ipoh and terminate at Simpang Pulai. Both the lines have 4 interconnected stations situated at Downtown Ipoh, including the Ipoh railway station, where passengers can interchange between both lines. It is also expected that Rapid KL will be operating once the construction has been completed.

Mass Rapid Transit (MRT)

In December 2010, the government approved the implementation of an MRT project and announced preliminary plans for the first line, stretching  from Sungai Buloh to Kajang through 35 stations. The line, known as Kajang Line, will pass through the city centre and will serve densely populated suburban areas including Kota Damansara, Mutiara Damansara, Bandar Utama, Taman Tun Dr Ismail, Bukit Damansara, Cheras, Bandar Tun Hussein Onn and Balakong, with a total catchment population of 1.2 million people. The Kajang Line entered full revenue service in July 2017.

Monorail

Malaysia's major monorail system is used for public transport in Kuala Lumpur. It has 11 stations. The line consists of two parallel rails for most of the way except at the end stations where switches merge the two rails into a single rail before entering the station. The entire network is elevated. The system uses two-car and four-car trains which were manufactured in Malaysia. It is operated by Rapid Rail.

There are proposals to construct monorails in Penang and Johor Bahru. The federal administrative centre of Putrajaya was also supposed to have a monorail network and the main station and several metres of track have been built. The project was postponed because of the then low population of the city. However, the Putrajaya Monorail projects are under plans to be revived.

Malacca has been proposed to build a  monorail line for urban mass-transit.
The monorail has been hit by a number of setbacks, including the suspension of the service after a British couple, Anne and James Croft, had to be rescued by firefighters when the monorail stopped unexpectedly between stations. Following this incident a number of safety upgrades have been suggested including the purchase of cherry pickers in case of any further stoppages. After 4 years being suspended since 2013 due to technical problems, the Malacca Monorail service begin operating again on 4 December 2017.

Cable Car Rail System (Funicular)

The Penang Hill Railway in Penang is the only cable car rail system type (funicular) in Malaysia. Both sections are single lines with passing loops at midway. The tracks are metre gauge and have an incline of over 50%.

Other modes of transport

Cable Car

The 2.4 km Awana Skyway is an aerial tramway type cable car connecting Awana/Sri Layang and Genting Grand Hotel, Genting Highlands in Malaysia, was built in 1975 and was then Malaysia's very first aerial lift cable car transport system before Genting Skyway is officially opened on 21 February 1997. It has ceased operations on 1 April 2014 to make way for the construction of a new cable car system using gondola lift type.
The Genting Skyway is a gondola lift connecting Gohtong Jaya and Resorts World Genting in Malaysia. Its lower station, located approximately 51 kilometres (32 mi) northeast of Kuala lumpur, comprises a 5-storey station building and a 10-storey car park while its upper station is located at the Highlands Hotel.
The Langkawi Cable Car is a gondola lift is one of the major attractions in Langkawi Island, Kedah, Malaysia. It provides an aerial lift service from the Oriental Village at Teluk Burau to the peak of Gunung Machinchang, which is also the location of the Langkawi Sky Bridge. The total length is 2.2 km (1.4 mi). It was officially opened in 2003.

Rail-based public transport in Kuala Lumpur

Railway operators

Keretapi Tanah Melayu Berhad

The main intercity passenger train operator is Keretapi Tanah Melayu (KTM), a corporation owned by the Malaysian government. It operates the diesel-hauled KTM Intercity passenger trains on the entire East Coast Line and the southern portion of the West Coast Line, and the electrified KTM ETS passenger trains along the remaining portion of the West Coast Line, between Padang Besar and Gemas and the Butterworth branch line. KTM also operates freight trains along both railway lines. Under the KTM Komuter, KTM operates commuter rail services along double-track and electrified portions of the West Coast Line between Tanjung Malim in Perak and Pulau Sebang in Negeri Sembilan, and between Padang Besar in Perlis and Padang Rengas in Perak, as well as the Butterworth, Port Klang and Batu Caves branch lines.

Besides its own network, KTM also operates trains on the Kerteh-Kuantan railway under contract with Petronas, the owner of the line.

Sabah State Railway
The Sabah State Railway, previously the North Borneo Railway, is the only state department in Malaysia to operate a railway service. It operates passenger and freight services along the 134 km railway line between Tanjung Aru and Tenom in East Malaysia.

Express Rail Link Sdn Bhd

The Express Rail Link (ERL) is a private company that was set up to develop and operate the high-speed railway between Kuala Lumpur's KL Sentral station and the Kuala Lumpur International Airport.  It operates two services along the 57 km standard gauge line, the non-stop KLIA Ekspres and the commuter-like KLIA Transit.  Trains on the two services can reach a maximum speed of 160 km/h and are the fastest in Malaysia.  Besides trains, the company also provides check-in facilities at its Kuala Lumpur City Airport Terminal at KL Sentral. Except for check-in baggage of passengers, Express Rail Link does not handle any cargo.

Rapid Rail 

Rapid Rail was set up by Prasarana Malaysia to operate the rapid transit public transport service in the Klang Valley. Prasarana Malaysia is fully owned by Ministry of Finance Incorporated, the corporate arm of the Malaysian Ministry of Finance.  The company currently operates two MRT lines, three LRT lines and one monorail line in Kuala Lumpur under the Rapid KL brand, namely the Kajang Line, Putrajaya Line, Ampang Line, Sri Petaling Line, Kelana Jaya Line and KL Monorail.

Other operators 
Malaysia Airports (Sepang) Berhad: The main operator of airports in Malaysia is also the operator of the Aerotrain at Kuala Lumpur International Airport.
Penang State Government: The state government of Penang operates the Penang Hill Railway.

History 

Railways in Malaysia began because of the need to transport tin from mines in the hinterland of the West Coast states of Peninsular Malaysia to coastal ports.  The first railway line, which was opened on 1 June 1885, was about 13 km long and ran between Port Weld and Taiping, the heart of the tin-rich Larut Valley in Perak state. The second line was opened a year later to link Kuala Lumpur, again the center of tin-mining activities in the Klang Valley, and Klang and subsequently to Port Swettenham (Port Klang today).

Timeline 
 1885 – The first railway line in Malaya between Taiping and Port Weld is officially opened on 1 June.
 1886 – Opening of line between Kuala Lumpur and Klang.
 July 1888 – The first train crash in the country occurred in Sungai Kerawai near Teluk Anson, Perak.
 1891 – Opening of the line between Seremban and Port Dickson. (Abandon)
 1893 – Teluk Anson to Tapah Road line opened. (Abandon)
 1896 – Federated Malay States Railway created, merging the operations of the initial four lines.
 1900 – Opening of the Victoria Railway Bridge across Perak River in Perak. (Taiping - Port Weld line)
 1903 – Line between Tank Road and Woodlands in Singapore opened for service.
 1909 – The West Coast Line between Prai in Penang state and Johor Bahru completed and opened.
 1910 – The first stretch of the East Coast Line between Gemas and Bahau is opened.
 1923 - Johor-Singapore Causeway was opened, connecting Singapore's railway network with the rest of Malaya.
 1931 – East Coast Line between Tumpat and Gemas completed with the opening of the last stretch between Gua Musang and Kuala Gris in Kelantan.
 3 August 1995 – The first KTM Komuter trains, Malaysia's first to be run on electricity, began taking passengers between Kuala Lumpur and Rawang.  Entire commuter train network opened to passengers with the final stretch to Seremban becoming operational on 18 December 1995.
 14 April 2002 – Malaysia's first high-speed train, the KLIA Ekspres between KL Sentral and Kuala Lumpur International Airport was officially launched.  At the same time, the Kuala Lumpur City Air Terminal in KL Sentral was also opened.
 1 July 2011 – KTM's Tanjong Pagar and Bukit Timah railway stations in Singapore were closed. All Singapore operations were moved to Woodlands Train Checkpoint.
 2013 - The stretch of rail between Seremban and Gemas was double tracked and electrified. ETS services ran the same year.
 2014 - The stretch of rail between Ipoh and Padang Besar was double tracked and electrified. ETS services ran the following year.

Projects and expansion plans

Gemas-Johor Bahru Electrification and Double-Tracking
The MYR 8 billion contract was expected to be tendered out by end 2008 pending a mid-term review of the Ninth Malaysia Plan. The project would have included building over 200 km of parallel railway tracks, including stations, depots, halts, yards and bridges and cover systems such as electrification, signalling and communications.
This included the realignment between Pulau Sebang, Melaka to Gemas section.

In May 2009, Global Rail Sdn Bhd, a relatively small contractor and its Chinese partner, China Infraglobe submitted a proposal to the Government to build and upgrade tracks from Gemas to Johor Bahru at a cost of MYR 5 billion. According to them, the project would be on a private finance initiative basis and the plan submitted to the Finance Ministry later in June 2009 was conditional upon signing over mineral rights in Johor State.

On 29 January 2011, Transport Minister Datuk Seri Kong Cho Ha said that the Gemas-Johor Bahru double-tracking and electrification project was expected to start that year. He added that the Government hoped to appoint the contractor for the project that year and Malaysia was still in the midst of talking with China Railway Construction, but nothing was confirmed yet. Kong said two consultants had been appointed, a design consultant and an independent checker, to monitor the project. The construction of the 197 km of tracks, at an estimated cost between MYR 6 billion and MYR 7 billion, would take three years.

On 27 October 2015, the public display exercise, required for all development of new railways under Section 84 of Malaysia's Land Public Transport Act 2010, for the Gemas-Johor Bahru Electrification Double Tracking Project began and will run until 27 January 2016. According to documents on display to the public, construction is expected to begin in 2016 and be completed in 2021.

The Chinese company CRCC has been awarded to build the Gemas-Johor Bahru Electrification and Double-Tracking project. Construction on the project began in Jan 2018. It is expected to be completed by the end of 2021.

The length of the line to be electrified and double-tracked is 197 km between Chainage 563.040 at Gemas and Chainage 754.180 at Johor Bahru. The upgraded line is supposed to cater for at least 22 services daily involving KTM ETS, KTM Intercity and shuttle train services as well as KTM Komuter.

The documents displayed also stated that the electrification for the stretch will have the same specifications as that of the Seremban-Gemas stretch, at 25 kV AC 50 Hz single phase and supplied via an overhead catenary. Train operations for this stretch will be integrated with the Train Control Centres at KL Sentral and Gemas. The design speed for the tracks is 160 km/h.

Klang Valley Double Track Project
The project was implemented by Keretapi Tanah Melayu began in 2016 and phase 1 is expected to be completed by 2021. This will focus on enhancing 16 stations along these routes and upgrade the existing signalling and electrification system. This will be reduced to just seven-and-a-half minutes once the KVDT is completed.

The 42 km rehabilitation under Phase I, which are:
Phase 1A (Rawang – Simpang Batu)
Phase 1B (Kuala Lumpur – Simpang Bangsar)
Phase 2 (Simpang Batu – Kuala Lumpur)
Phase 3 (Sentul – Simpang Batu)
Phase 4 (Simpang Bangsar – Salak Selatan)

Phase II is from Simpang - Pelabuhan Klang and Salak Selatan - Seremban.

Penang Transport Master Plan
The Penang Transport Master Plan is a proposed, mixed-mode transport scheme for the state of Penang in norther Peninsular Malaysia conceived by the Penang state government, consisting of light rail, bus and rapid transit systems. The Bayan Lepas light rapid transit (LRT) line will be the first LRT line in Penang. It is The first and one of the priority projects of the Master Plan. The proposed 22 km (14 mi) will exclusively serve the Penang Island, and will link the city centre of George Town in the north with the industrial town of Bayan Lepas to the south of the island.

East Coast Rail Link
The East Coast Rail Link (ECRL) is a planned standard gauge double-track railway link infrastructure project connecting Port Klang on the Straits of Malacca to Kota Bharu in northeast Peninsular Malaysia via Putrajaya, connecting the East Coast Economic Region states of Pahang, Terengganu and Kelantan to one another, and to the Central Region of the Peninsular's west coast. The project was proposed to provide high speed inter-city rail service to the east coast states and to complement the KTM East Coast Line. Currently, Terengganu is the only state in Peninsular Malaysia without a passenger railway system, as the KTM East Coast Line on services Pahang and Kelantan.

Johor Bahru-Singapore Rapid Transit System

The Johor Bahru-Singapore Rapid Transit System (RTS Link) is a planned cross-border rapid transit system that would connect Woodlands, Singapore and Johor Bahru, Malaysia, crossing the Straits of Johor.

The rapid transit system will have two stations, with the Singaporean terminus located at Woodlands North station (interchanging with the Singapore MRT system) and the Malaysia terminus at Bukit Chagar station (interchange with the proposed Iskandar Malaysia BRT system). Both stations will have co-located Singaporean and Malaysian customs, immigration and quarantine facilities.

When built, the RTS Link will be the second rail link between the two countries after the KTM Intercity Shuttle Tebrau, and the first high-capacity international metro system to be built. The RTS Link is expected to replace the railway line and shuttle train services between JB Sentral and Woodlands Train Checkpoint, completing the withdrawal of KTM operations from Singapore.

Kuala Lumpur Light Rapid Transit (LRT) system expansion

On 29 August 2006, then Malaysian Deputy Prime Minister Mohd Najib Abdul Razak announced a RM10 billion plan to expand Kuala Lumpur's public transport network. The plan included extending the existing Kelana Jaya Line from Kelana Jaya via Subang Jaya to Putra Heights and the Sri Petaling Line from Sri Petaling to Putra Heights via Puchong.

Prasarana Malaysia, the owner of the LRT lines, signed an agreement on 13 October 2006 with Bombardier and a Malaysian company joint venture for the purchase of 22 light rail vehicle sets with an option for another 13 for RM1.2 billion for the Kelana Jaya Line. The 22 vehicles will have four cars each and will boost the carrying capacity of the fleet by 1,500 people. The 22 sets will be delivered from August 2008. The new rolling stock was put into full operation by 2016. end-2010. As for the Ampang and Sri Petaling Line, the rolling stock currently consists of a fleet of 50 new trains that are deployed to increase the capacity of the line and provide a better service. Each of the new trains is six cars long and provided by CSR Zhuzhou of China.

The entire project and fleet expansion was completed and have been in full operation since 30 June 2016.

A third LRT system is under construction which, once completed, will link the city centre with the cities of Shah Alam and Klang. The line, which spans 37 km, has 25 permanent stations under construction, five of them being kept as provisional stations for the future. The LRT line is planned to be fully operational by 2026.

Sarawak rail transportation projects

Terengganu and Sarawak are the only two states in Malaysia that do not have railway infrastructure. In Sarawak, a railway line existed before the Second World War, but the last remnants of the line were dismantled in 1959.

As part of Sarawak Corridor of Renewable Energy project, the government is planning a 320 km railway track between Similajau in Bintulu Division and Tanjung Manis in Mukah Division. The cost and plans for the project timeline is yet to be revealed.

Another railway line, the Sarawak Railway Line is a proposed project by the Malaysian government to establishing a railway network in the state of Sarawak. In 2008, it was reported the project will be ready in 2015 but still no signs of development by the government until present.

The Kuching LRT system is a proposed light rapid transit (LRT) system network in Kuching, the capital city of Sarawak. as one of the methods to ease traffic congestion in the city. The proposed LRT lines will connect Kuching to Samarahan and Serian. The construction of the RM10.8 billion project was expected to commence by 2019 and was scheduled to be operational by 2024.

Sabah rail transportation projects 

On 17 September 2015, it was announced that the Sabah State Railway will be extended to cover the northern and east coast areas, mainly to major towns of Kudat, Sandakan and Tawau. On 21 March 2017, around RM1 million has been allocated for the project study. Once the project is complete, there is also a proposal to connecting the rail networks of Sabah and Sarawak in Malaysia with the provinces of Kalimantan in Indonesia that will be called as "Trans-Borneo Railway", as Indonesia were currently developing the railway network on their side.

A proposed monorail line project is to be constructed in the Kota Kinabalu area by the Sabah state government. The proposals generated mixed reactions between the mayor and politicians. As reported in the government website, the project was in the ground breaking process under the Kota Kinabalu development plan.

A new rapid transit line has also been proposed to ease traffic congestions in Kota Kinabalu, the capital of Sabah. On 27 August 2019, the Kota Kinabalu City Hall (DBKK) has submitted a proposal to build an LRT or MRT to the federal government. The city authorities are currently waiting for budget on the project.

On 2021, a skytrain system of Kota Kinabalu was proposed. The skytrain is planned to connect the Kota Kinabalu International Airport and Universiti Malaysia Sabah.4 companies which will be involved in the skytrain project signed a memorandum of understanding on 29 November. The skytrain will be built by phases, with phase 1 will be connecting the airport to the city centre, while phase 2 will extended till Alamesra, near the university.

Klang Valley Mass Rapid Transit (MRT)

The Klang Valley Mass Rapid Transit project is a proposed three-line 150 km MRT system by Gamuda Berhad-MMC Corporation Berhad for the Klang Valley which envisages a "Wheel and Spoke" concept comprising two northeast–southwest radial lines and one circle line looping around Kuala Lumpur. The proposal was announced in early-June 2010 and construction works were targeted to commence in early 2011, leading to project completion in 2016 for the first line.

The MRT system will be the backbone of a new transport system in Klang Valley, which will be home to an estimated 10 million people by 2020. The MRT system will be integrated with the existing LRT, monorail, KTM Komuter and intra- and inter-city bus services to form an effective public transportation system.

In December 2010, the Government announced that the Kajang Line will be the first to take off. The Kajang Line will run from Sungai Buloh to Kajang through the Kuala Lumpur city centre. This route which runs from north-west to south-east of Kuala Lumpur is densely populated and is currently inadequately served by the then existing rail-based public transport. Upon completion, the line is estimated to provide service to 1.2 million people with an estimated daily ridership of 442,000.

Construction of the line was officially launched on 8 July 2011 by then Malaysian Prime Minister Najib Razak. Phase 1 of the line, from Sungai Buloh to Semantan station was operational by December 2016 while the remainder of the line opened in July 2017.

The MRT system will be owned by the Government of Malaysia through the Mass Rapid Transit Corporation (MRT Corp), a special purpose vehicle which is 100% owned by the Minister of Finance Incorporated. Rapid Rail, which is the current operator of the Klang Valley's LRT and monorail lines operated the MRT lines under its integrated fare system.

A second MRT line, the Putrajaya Line, is currently under construction and is slated to be completed and fully operational by January 2023. The third MRT line, the Circle Line, is another proposed line and would be the "Wheel" component of the MRT project. The line was recently approved by the Cabinet and is currently awaiting the tendering process. Constructions are expected to commence by December 2028.

See also 

 Rail transport by country
 Transport in Malaysia
 Klang Valley Integrated Transit System
 Kuala Lumpur–Singapore high-speed rail
 Railway stations in South East Asia

Notes

References